Sweet Dreamers is a 1981 Australian film directed by Tom Cowan and starring Richard Moir and Sue Smithers. The film is about a filmmaker and his girlfriend.

Cowan has said the film was very autobiographical and met with a great deal of resistance from funding bodies. It was the last dramatic feature film directed by Cowan for a long time.

The film was partly funded by the Creative Development Branch of the Australian Film Commission.

References

External links
Sweet Dreamers at IMDb

Australian drama films
1980s English-language films
1980s Australian films